Killer Elite: the Hits, the Highs, the Vids is a compilation album by British power metal band DragonForce. It was released on 3 April 2016 and was supported by the band through the Killer Elite World Tour lasting from April to September 2016.

Track listing

CD

DVD - The Vids
DVD contains all the DragonForce music videos so far.

Personnel
Marc Hudson – lead vocals (tracks 2, 4, 8, 10, 16, 18 and 19)
ZP Theart - lead vocals (tracks 1, 3, 5-7, 9, 11-15, 17 and 20-22) 
Herman Li – guitars, backing vocals, acoustic guitar
Sam Totman – guitars, backing vocals, acoustic guitar
Frédéric Leclercq – bass, backing vocals (tracks 2-4, 7-8, 10-11, 16 and 18-21)
Adrian Lambert - bass (tracks 1, 6, 9, 12, 14-15 and 17)
Diccon Harper - bass (5, 13 and 22)
Vadim Pruzhanov - keyboards, backing vocals, piano, additional acoustic guitar
Gee Anzalone – drums, backing vocals (track 18 only)
Dave Mackintosh - drums, backing vocals (all tracks except 5, 13, 18 and 22)
Didier Almouzni - drums (tracks 5, 13 and 22)

References 

2016 compilation albums
DragonForce albums
Metal Blade Records compilation albums
Albums produced by Karl Groom
Albums produced by Jens Bogren